Shipton Lee is a hamlet and former civil parish, now in the parish of Quainton, in the Aylesbury Vale district, in the county of Buckinghamshire, England. In 1881 the parish had a population of 61. From 1866 to 1886 Shipton Lee was a civil parish in its own right.

References 

Hamlets in Buckinghamshire
Former civil parishes in Buckinghamshire
Aylesbury Vale